Goblin Slayer is an anime television series based on the Japanese dark fantasy light novel series Goblin Slayer written by Kumo Kagyu and illustrated by Noboru Kannatuki. The 12-episode anime television series adaptation by White Fox aired from October 7 to December 30, 2018, and was broadcast on AT-X, Tokyo MX, Sun TV, and BS11. The series is directed by Takaharu Ozaki, with scripts penned by Hideyuki Kurata and Yōsuke Kuroda, character designs handled by Takashi Nagayoshi and music composed by Kenichirō Suehiro. Funimation licensed and produced an English dub for the series, with Crunchyroll simulcast the series internationally.

On January 31, 2021, a second season of the anime TV series was announced at GA FES 2021. It is produced by Liden Films and directed by Misato Takada, with Ozaki serving as chief director, and Hiromi Kato designing the characters. Kurata and Suehiro are returning as scriptwriter and composer, respectively. The second season is set to premiere in 2023.


Series overview

Episode list

Season 1 (2018)

Season 2 (2023)

Notes

References

External links
  
 

Goblin Slayer
Goblin Slayer episode lists